General elections were held in Romania in May and June 1926. The Chamber of Deputies was elected on 25 May, whilst the Senate was elected in two stages in May and 10 June. The result was a victory for the governing People's Party, which, together with the allied Romanian National Party (as revived by Vasile Goldiș), Magyar Party and German Party, won 292 of the 387 seats in the Chamber of Deputies and 107 of the 115 seats in the Senate elected through universal male vote. With some exceptions, the Peasants' Party and the main branch of the National Party ran on common lists under the name of National Peasant Bloc.

Results

Chamber of Deputies

Senate

References

Parliamentary elections in Romania
Romania
1926 in Romania
Romania
Romania
Election and referendum articles with incomplete results
1926 elections in Romania